Czechoslovakia national field hockey team may refer to:
 Czechoslovakia men's national field hockey team
 Czechoslovakia women's national field hockey team